

This is intended to be a complete list of the properties and districts on the National Register of Historic Places in Scott County, Iowa, United States. Latitude and longitude coordinates are provided for many National Register properties and districts; these locations may be seen together in a map.

There are 288 properties and districts listed on the National Register in the county, including 1 National Historic Landmark. The city of Davenport is the location of 257 of these properties and districts; they are listed separately, while the remaining 32 properties and districts, including the National Historic Landmark, are listed here.

Current listings

Davenport

Outside Davenport

|--
|}

Former listings

|}

See also

 List of National Historic Landmarks in Iowa
 National Register of Historic Places listings in Iowa
 Listings in neighboring counties: Cedar, Clinton, Muscatine, Rock Island (IL)

References

Scott